Slayyyter is the debut mixtape by American singer Slayyyter. It was released on September 17, 2019 on her birthday through the singer's label Slayyyter Records. The mixtape received positive reviews from music critics, who praised the production, lyrical content and Slayyyter's vocal performance.

Track listing
All tracks were written by Slayyyter, except where noted.

References

2019 mixtape albums
Debut mixtape albums
Slayyyter albums